Moores Mills is an unincorporated community in Charlotte County, New Brunswick.

It is near Saint David Ridge, northeast of St. Stephen at Route 745, Route 3 and Route 750.

History

Notable people

See also
List of communities in New Brunswick

References

Communities in Charlotte County, New Brunswick